Diogo Augusto Pacheco da Fontoura, nickname Diogo Rincón or just Rincón (born on 18 April 1980 in Porto Alegre, Rio Grande do Sul) is a retired professional Brazilian football player, who played as a midfielder.  After retiring, he had depression and alcohol problems, but has since recovered.

He became the first South American footballer in Ukraine who was among the best scorers in the Ukrainian Premier League.

Early life 

Rincon started playing football at the age of ten.

Club career 
Rincón was a product of Internacional's youth academy and was a featured regular prior to his transfer to Ukrainian giants Dynamo Kyiv in 2002. Unlike many other South Americans who were unable to succeed at Dynamo, Rincon is one of the few successes, having claimed a starting role at Dynamo after his first year at the Ukrainian club. Rincon holds the record for the fastest goal in Dynamo's European history – 24 seconds against Turkish club Fenerbahçe on 8 August 2006 in a UEFA Champions League qualifier.

In February 2008, Rincón left FC Dynamo Kyiv and joined on loan to Corinthians, in November 2008 turned back to Ukraine. On 25 April 2009, the Brazilian midfielder has terminated his contract with Dynamo Kyiv upon his request, he was a free agent and returned to Brazil. The player who plays in the attacking midfielder role signed on 25 July 2009 with Kavala he comes on a free transfer and signed until June 2010.

International career 
Rincón is former member of the U-17 Brazil squad that won the U-17 World Cup in 1997.

Career statistics

Club

Honours 

Campeonato Gaucho: 2002

Ukrainian Premier League: 2003, 2004, 2007

Ukrainian Cup: 2003, 2005, 2006, 2007

References

External links 
Official team website

 CBF
http://futpedia.globo.com/jogadores/diogo-rincon
 

1980 births
Association football midfielders
Footballers from Porto Alegre
Living people
Brazilian footballers
Brazilian expatriate footballers
FC Dynamo Kyiv players
FC Dynamo-2 Kyiv players
Kidnapped Brazilian people
Sport Club Internacional players
Sport Club Corinthians Paulista players
Kavala F.C. players
Canoas Sport Club players
Campeonato Brasileiro Série B players
Ukrainian Premier League players
Ukrainian First League players
Expatriate footballers in Ukraine
Expatriate footballers in Greece
Brazilian expatriate sportspeople in Ukraine
Brazilian expatriate sportspeople in Greece
Ukrainian Cup top scorers